Niobe is a genus of trilobites in the family Asaphidae.

References

Asaphidae
Asaphida genera
Paleozoic life of Newfoundland and Labrador
Paleozoic life of Yukon